The action of 6 February 1799 was a minor naval action that took place during the French Revolutionary Wars off the island of Majorca between two Royal Navy ships and two Spanish naval frigates.

By the end of 1798 the situation had changed in the Mediterranean with the destruction of the French fleet at Aboukir and the capture of the Spanish island of Menorca in November 1798 by British forces. The Royal Navy were using the island as a place to launch raids and conduct further operations.

On 6 February 1799, HMS Argo and  HMS  surprised two Spanish frigates at anchor near the south point of the Bahia de Alcudia on Majorca. The Spanish set sail with the British in pursuit but a violent westerly gale came up that took away Leviathans main top-sail. After dark the Spanish frigates separated but Leviathan had fallen behind and saw neither the separation nor Argos signal that she had chased the one to port.

Leviathan had nearly caught up with Argo, who had fired bow chasers damaging the Santa Theresas smaller sails, slowing her down. More damage was inflicted but this time from the gale damaging more sails and rigging. At about midnight Argo got alongside the Santa Theresa and fired a broadside that wounded two men and badly damaged Santa Theresas rigging. At this point the Spanish captain of Santa Theresa Don Pablo Perez realized that further resistance was futile and after a conference with his men struck her colours.  Santa Theresa was upwards of 950 tons burthen, carrying 42 guns plus coehorns and swivel guns and in addition to her crew of 280 seamen and marines, she had 250 soldiers on board. Santa Theresa had recently been completely refurbished and provisioned for a four-month cruise. Her consort Proserpine, which had escaped, though smaller, was equally well armed. The Santa Theresa  was bought into British service and kept the name.

Operations continued from Menorca, 16 February Argo and Leviathan attacked the town of Cambrils.

Notes

References

Conflicts in 1799
Naval battles involving Great Britain
Naval battles involving Spain
Naval battles of the Napoleonic Wars